The following highways are numbered 766:

United States